Janata Dal (United) ("People’s Party (United)"), abbreviated as JD(U), is an Indian political party with political presence mainly in eastern and north-eastern India. JD(U) is recognised as a state party in the states of Bihar, Arunachal Pradesh and Manipur and is a part of government in Bihar. JD(U) heads the government in Bihar and has remained the second largest party in Manipur. JD(U) won 16 seats in the 2019 Indian general election, making it the seventh largest party in the Lok Sabha.

The Janata Dal (United) was formed with the merger of the Sharad Yadav faction of the Janata Dal, the Lok Shakti Party and the Samata Party on 30 October 2003. But the Election Commission of India refused the merger of the Samata Party, then Brahmanand Mandal became the president, but he was suffering from Alzheimer's disease and not physically well, so Uday Mandal became president and he has taken charge of the Samata Party. Janata Dal (United)'s party mentor and patron is the veteran socialist leader George Fernandes. JD(U) is currently a part of the Mahagathbandhan alliance.

History

Formation

The Janata Dal (United)'s origins go back to before the 1999 General Election. A faction led by then Chief Minister of Karnataka J. H. Patel had lent support to the National Democratic Alliance, leading to the split in the Janata Dal leading to the formation of Janata Dal (Secular) under H. D. Deve Gowda, who wanted to remain equidistant from both national parties; and Janata Dal under Sharad Yadav was called Janata Dal (United).

The Janata Dal (United) was formed with the merger of the Sharad Yadav faction of the Janata Dal, the Lok Shakti and the Samata Party. On 30 October 2003, the Samata Party led by George Fernandes and Nitish Kumar merged with the Janata Dal. The merged entity was called Janata Dal (United) with the arrow symbol of Janata Dal (United) and the green and white flag of the Samata Party. The uniting force is believed to be common opposition to Rashtriya Janata Dal in Bihar especially after the Rashtriya Janata Dal welcomed Samata Party rebels like Raghunath Jha into the party.

In NDA

JD(U) joined NDA and along with its alliance partner, the BJP defeated the RJD-led UPA government in Bihar in November 2005. New government was headed by JD(U) leader, Nitish Kumar and NDA continued to govern state. The alliance contested 2009 Indian general election and won 32 seats. BJP won 12 while JD(U) won 20. JD(U) won 115 and BJP won 91 seats in 2010 Bihar Legislative Assembly election. Thus together holding 206 seats in 243 member Bihar Legislative Assembly.

Out of NDA

JD(U) broke its 17 years old alliance with the BJP in Bihar in protest against the elevation of Narendra Modi as ahead of the election campaign committee of BJP for 2014 Indian general election. JD(U) President Sharad Yadav and then Bihar Chief Minister Nitish Kumar announced their end of coalition at a press conference on 16 June 2013, exactly a week after Narendra Modi was made the BJP's campaign committee chairman, who was later made the prime ministerial candidate of NDA. Just after this split, Sharad Yadav relinquished his position as the NDA convenor.

The JD(U) contested the election in Bihar in an alliance with the Communist Party of India but they won only two seats out of total forty seats of Bihar while the BJP-LJP alliance won 31 seats. Following poor performance in election, Nitish Kumar resigned as Chief Minister of Bihar and Jitan Ram Manjhi sworn in as a new Chief Minister. When the trust vote was demanded by the BJP to prove majority in Bihar Legislative Assembly, the RJD supported the JD(U) in the assembly on 23 May 2014 to pass the majority mark.

On 09 August, 2022, JD(U) is out of NDA.

The Mahagathbandhan (Grand Alliance)

On 29 December 2014, Kerala-based Socialist Janata (Democratic) merged with the JD(U) with its leader M.P. Veerendra Kumar, accepting the party flag from JD(U) leader Nitish Kumar. This was an important milestone in bringing a pan-Indian appeal to the JD(U) which is largely limited to the state of Bihar.

On 14 April 2015, the JD(U), Janata Dal (Secular), Rashtriya Janata Dal, the Indian National Lok Dal, Samajwadi Party, and Samajwadi Janata Party announced that they would merge into a new national Janata Parivar alliance in order to fight against the BJP in cooperation with one another, thus leaving the UPA. But for some reason this did not take place and the Samajwadi Party was subsequently offered 3 seats out of an assembly of 243 in the Bihar elections. Unhappy with this deal, it left the alliance and fought the elections separately.
On 9 May, MLA Jitan Ram Manjhi was expelled from the JD(U) and he later founded the Hindustani Awam Morcha along with 17 other dissent JD(U) MLAs.

In the 2015 Bihar Legislative Assembly election JD(U) contested the election in an alliance with the RJD and Congress. It won 71 seats out of the 101 seats it contested and the alliance won 178 seats out the 243 seats in the assembly. Subsequently, Nitish Kumar again became the Chief Minister of Bihar.

In the biennial elections to the Rajya Sabha held in March 2016, the ruling UDF of Kerala state gave one seat to JD(U) Kerala State Unit President M.P. Veerendra Kumar. In spite of having just 2 MLAs in the Legislative Assembly, the Congress gave a berth to its ally.

On 09 August, 2022, Nitish Kumar announced that the JD(U)'s alliance with the BJP in the Bihar Legislative Assembly was over. He further made a claim that the new government in Bihar, a coalition of nine parties including the RJD and the INC would be a "Mahagathgandhan 2.0."

Alliance with NDA

On 26 July 2017 5 pm, Nitish Kumar tendered his resignation as Chief Minister of Bihar, ending 20-month-old Mahgathbandhan (grand alliance) rule. The next day on 27 July 2017 10 am he again took oath as Chief Minister of Bihar with the support of BJP. Same day evening, Kerala JD(U) chief M.P. Veerendra Kumar announced the split of Kerala unit of the JD(U) from the party, due to Nitish Kumar led Bihar unit joined hands with the BJP. On 28 July 2017, new NDA government won trust vote in Bihar assembly by 131 votes in favour and 108 against, four legislators did not vote.

2020 Assembly elections and aftermath
The JD(U), just like its parent Samata Party, had the core support of Kushwaha and Kurmi caste, which emanated from the great rally organised in 1993 at Gandhi Maidan, Patna. In 2020 Assembly elections, the party performed badly, and its seats in Bihar Legislative Assembly reduced to 43 from 75 in 2015 elections. The breakaway of the faction led by Upendra Kushwaha, who founded Rashtriya Lok Samata Party, was recognised as one of the principal reason behind reduction in support base of the party in many constituencies. In a bid to retain its support amongst its core vote base, the party made several organisational changes, like appointing Ramchandra Prasad Singh as national president of the party and Umesh Kushwaha as the state president. Meanwhile, it also tried to give effect to the merger of the Upendra Kushwaha led RLSP with itself. The RLSP was formed as a result of a split in JD(U) in 2013. Immediately after the merger, Upendra Kushwaha was made president of parliamentary board of the party.

Electoral Performance

Lok Sabha Elections

Bihar Vidhan Sabha

Jharkhand Vidhan Sabha

Arunachal Pradesh Vidhan Sabha

Manipur Vidhan Sabha

Prominent members

 Nitish Kumar, Chief Minister of Bihar.
Umesh Kushwaha, Bihar state President of Janata Dal (United).
 K.C. Tyagi, Secretary General & National Spokesperson.
Abhay Kushwaha, Former President of Youth wing of Janata Dal (United).
 Vijay Kumar Chaudhary, Speaker of Bihar Legislative Assembly, Former Bihar JD(U) President, Former Leader of JD(U) Legislature Party, .
Harivansh Narayan Singh – Deputy Chairman of the Rajya Sabha (2018)
 Bashistha Narain Singh, Member of Parliament in Rajya Sabha.
 Ram Nath Thakur, JDU Party leader in Rajya Sabha.
 Rajiv Ranjan Singh, Member of Parliament, Former Bihar JD(U) President.
Bijendra Prasad Yadav, Minister for Energy, Registration, Excise and Prohibition, Government of Bihar
Monazir Hassan, Former Cabinet Minister Government of Bihar, Former MP Begusarai

List of Chief Ministers

Chief Ministers of Bihar

National President
 Sharad Yadav – (2004 to 2016) Founder President
 Nitish Kumar – 2016 to 2020
 Ramchandra Prasad Singh – 2020 to 2021
 Lalan Singh – from 2021

References

External links
 

 
Political parties established in 1999
2003 establishments in India
Janata Dal